Bahry TV was established in Kuwait. It is the only marine-thematic broadcasting channel that caters to Arabic TV viewers.

Distribution Platform
Bahry TV broadcasts free-to-air over digital satellite transmission, able to reach the TV sets of viewers in the Middle East and North Africa.

Bahry International Magazine
Founded in 2001 as an initiative of the Al-Nafisi brother's, the Bahry International Magazine(BIM) is the Middle East's premier Marine Arabic Magazine that covers water activities such as water sports, yachting, boating, fishing, diving and sailing, in addition to the new technology of boat engines, GPS, radars, etc.

The Essence of Bahry TV
The only marine TV station to be launched in MENA.

The end
Bahry has announced the end of Bahry TV's journey, it is no longer broadcasting.

External links
  Bahry TV
  Bahry English

Television stations in Kuwait